I. maculata may refer to:

 Idioptera maculata, a crane fly
 Ilisia maculata, a crane fly
 Inocybe maculata, a brown mushroom
 Iphinoe maculata, a hooded shrimp
 Isosillago maculata, a marine fish
 Ixia maculata, an iris native to South Africa